
San Francisco Lake is a lake in the Beni Department, Bolivia. At an elevation of 138 m, its surface area is 12.7 km².

Lakes of Beni Department